Mahmoud Shakir (born 6 February 1935) is an Iraqi weightlifter. He competed in the men's middle heavyweight event at the 1964 Summer Olympics.

References

1935 births
Living people
Iraqi male weightlifters
Olympic weightlifters of Iraq
Weightlifters at the 1964 Summer Olympics
Place of birth missing (living people)
20th-century Iraqi people